Michael Seltenreich (born 1988 in Tel Aviv) is an Israeli composer of contemporary classical music who resides in New York City. He is the sole Israeli composer to win the Toru Takemitsu Composition Award and a recipient of the Israel Prime Minister Award in Composition. His work Sparks & Flares was the submission of the American chapter of the International Society for Contemporary Music and was chosen for performance at the World Music Days / Beijing Modern Music Festival 2018.

Biography 
Seltenreich was born in Tel Aviv. He graduated from Thelma Yellin High School for The Arts in 2006. By 2011 he received a bachelor's degree in music composition from Buchmann-Mehta School of Music of Tel Aviv University, where he primarily studied with composer Gil Shohat. In 2014 he relocated to New York to pursue a master's degree from The Juilliard School. During his time at Juilliard, he studied primarily with German composer and conductor Matthias Pintscher. Currently he is a MacCracken Doctoral Fellow at New York University.

Seltenreich is internationally active as a composer, and in 2016 he was commissioned by Messiaen au pays de la Meije. Subsequently, he was commissioned by Santa Fe Chamber Music Festival, and participated in IRCAM's Manifeste in 2018. Seltenreich held residencies in Atlantic Center for the Arts where he acted as an Associate Composer in Residence with Austrian composer Georg Friedrich Haas, and at the Yaddo artist community.

Critical reception 
During the ISCM Award Ceremony in Beijing (2018), the jury described their motivations for selecting Seltenreich as the award winner and referred to his music as "engaging, effervescent, energetic, and assured" and that it "demonstrates detailed control of the materials and a sophistication that makes us eager to hear more".

Japanese composer, Toshi Ichiyanagi explained that Seltenreich's "sophisticated orchestration technique" and his music's "refinement in the way the nuances are brought out" along with its "richness of expression" were his motivations for selecting Seltenreich as a finalist for the Toru Takemitsu Composition Award. Finally, when he chose Seltenreich's piece, "ARCHETYPE", as the receipt of the 1st prize, Ichyanagi explained that it "was a very rare piece in that it was very precisely and densely written" presenting a "very modern motif that resulted in creating a very deep, thick musical texture"

Selected works

Orchestral 
Psalm Symphony (2017) for narrator, choir, orchestra, and children's choir
Élégie (2016) for solo piano, and string orchestra
ARCHETYPE (2015) for symphony orchestra
Comments regarding the aforementioned poem (2014) for string orchestra and narrator

Ensemble 
ICD-10 Chapter V: Mental and behavioral disorders (2018) for flute, oboe, clarinet, percussion, piano, 2 violins, viola, and cello
Sparks & Flares (2010) for flute, clarinet, percussion, piano, violin, and cello

Chamber 
Stalgamite & Stalactite (2018) for string quartet
Schnaïm (2016) for two pianos
Onot (2015) for string quartet

Solo 
Lumière Lent (2015) for cello
Fantasy of a Broken Bridge (2010) for piano

Choral 
Notes From The Wailing Wall (2013) for 17 voices
Ligeia (2011) for women's choir and harp
Water War (2008) for mixed choir, children's choir, and two percussionists

Selected awards
2018 International Society for Contemporary Music's Young Composer Award
2017 ACUM Award
2016 The Israeli Prime Minister's Award in Composition
2016 Toru Takemitsu Composition Award
2012 Salvatore Martirano Memorial Composition Award

References

External links

1988 births
Living people
Tel Aviv University alumni
Juilliard School alumni
Musicians from Tel Aviv
Israeli expatriates in the United States
Israeli classical composers
American classical composers
American male composers
Contemporary classical composers
Experimental composers
Avant-garde composers
Microtonal composers
21st-century American male musicians
20th-century American male musicians